Ulises Pascua (born 5 December 1989) is a Qatari born-Argentine footballer who plays for Al-Shahania.

References

External links
 

Argentine footballers
Qatari footballers
1989 births
Living people
Al-Rayyan SC players
Al-Shahania SC players
Al-Wakrah SC players
Al Kharaitiyat SC players
Qatar Stars League players
Qatari Second Division players
Association football midfielders
Naturalised citizens of Qatar
People from Chivilcoy
Sportspeople from Buenos Aires Province